Tricolia ios is a species of small sea snail with calcareous opercula, a marine gastropod mollusk in the family Phasianellidae, the pheasant snails.

Distribution
This species occurs in the subtidal zone in the Red Sea and in the Indian Ocean off Somalia, Kenya, Tanzania and Mozambique.

References

External links
 To World Register of Marine Species

Phasianellidae
Gastropods described in 1985